Aliabad-e Kenar Shahr (also Romanized as ‘Alīābād-e Kenār Shahr) is a village in Estarabad-e Shomali Rural District, Baharan District, Gorgan County, Golestan Province, Iran. At the 2006 census, its population was 1,180, in 291 families.

References 

Populated places in Gorgan County